The 2020 All-Ireland Senior Hurling Championship was the 133rd staging of the All-Ireland Senior Hurling Championship, the Gaelic Athletic Association's premier inter-county hurling tournament, since its establishment in 1887. The 2020 fixtures were announced in October 2019. Games were initially scheduled to begin on 9 May 2020. Due to the impact of the COVID-19 pandemic on Gaelic games, the competition was delayed before beginning on 24 October 2020 and ending on 13 December 2020.

Laois returned to the Leinster Championship for the first time since 2017, replacing Carlow who were relegated in 2019. Tipperary entered the championship as the defending champions and were attempting to retain the title for the first time since 1965. They were knocked out at the All-Ireland quarter final stage following a defeat by Galway.

On 13 December 2020, Limerick won the championship after a 0-30 to 0-19 win over Waterford in the All-Ireland final at Croke Park. It was their ninth championship title overall and their first title since 2018.

Waterford's Stephen Bennett was the championship's top scorer with 1-54.

Competition format

Initially, the 2020 All-Ireland hurling championship format was to feature five-team groups in both Leinster and Munster and the two Joe McDonagh Cup finalists in the format introduced in 2018 for an initial three-year period. At the GAA Congress on 29 February 2019 it was decided to expand the Leinster Hurling Championship from five to six teams, beginning in 2021. This meant there would be no relegation from the Leinster Hurling Championship in 2020 and that the winners of the Joe McDonagh Cup would be promoted.

Due to the COVID-19 pandemic in Ireland, some changes were announced on 26 June 2020. The format reverted to knockout provincial championships, along with qualifiers, similar to the 2017 format. The two Joe McDonagh Cup finalists did not compete in the senior championship.

The draws for the Munster and Leinster Senior Hurling Championships took place live on RTÉ's Six One news on Friday 26 June.

Teams

Stadiums and locations

Personnel and general information

Summary

Championships

Provincial championships

Leinster Senior Hurling Championship

Leinster Quarter-final

Leinster Semi-finals

Leinster final

Munster Senior Hurling Championship
Five of the six Munster counties participate. Kerry compete in the Joe McDonagh Cup. The competition is entirely knock-out.

Munster quarter-final

Munster semi-finals

Munster final

All-Ireland Qualifiers
Of the six teams who don’t reach their provincial final (three from the Leinster championship and three from the Munster championship) four are drawn, two from Leinster versus two from Munster, to play in round one of the qualifiers, subject to the requirement that the two beaten provincial quarter-finalists play in round one. The two teams given byes play the round one winners in round two.

The winners of round two compete in the two All-Ireland quarter-finals against the beaten Leinster and Munster finalists.

Qualifiers Round 1

Qualifiers Round 2

All-Ireland

All-Ireland quarter-finals

All-Ireland semi-finals

The Leinster and Munster champions play the winners of the two quarter-finals.

All-Ireland final

Championship statistics

Top scorers

Overall

In a single game

Miscellaneous

 Clare and Limerick qualified for the 2020 National Hurling League Division 1 final. The single match between Clare and Limerick played on 25 October 2020 was both the National Hurling League Final and the Munster Hurling Championship Quarter-final.
 Limerick retained the Munster Championship for the first time since 1981

Live televised games 

RTÉ, the national broadcaster in Ireland provided the majority of the live television coverage of the hurling championship in the fourth year of a five-year deal running from 2017 until 2021.		
Sky Sports also broadcast a number of matches and have exclusive rights to some games. Sky Sports televised all of its live Championship games as part of its basic package on Sky Sports Mix.

Awards
Sunday Game Team of the Year
The Sunday Game team of the year was picked on 13 December the night of the final.
The panel consisting of Donal Óg Cusack, Jackie Tyrell, Ursula Jacob, and Shane Dowling picked Gearóid Hegarty as the Sunday game player of the year.
	
 1. Nickie Quaid (Limerick)
 2. Sean Finn (Limerick)
 3. Dan Morrissey (Limerick)
 4. Daithi Burke (Galway)
 5. Diarmuid Byrnes (Limerick)
 6. Tadhg de Búrca (Waterford)
 7. Kyle Hayes (Limerick)
 8. Cian Lynch (Limerick)
 9. Jamie Barron (Waterford)
 10. Tom Morrissey (Limerick)
 11. TJ Reid (Kilkenny)
 12. Gearóid Hegarty (Limerick)
 13. Stephen Bennett (Waterford)
 14. Aaron Gillane (Limerick)
 15. Tony Kelly (Clare)

All Star Team of the Year
In February 2021, the 2020 PwC All-Stars winners were presented at Dublin's Convention Centre. Gearóid Hegarty was named as the All Stars Hurler of the Year with Eoin Cody named the All Stars Young Hurler of the Year.

References 

 
2020 in hurling
All-Ireland Championship